Shlomo Ben-Ami (born 17 July 1943) is a former Israeli diplomat, politician, and historian.

Biography
Shlomo Benabou (later Ben-Ami) was born in Tangiers, Morocco. He immigrated to Israel in 1955. He was educated at Tel Aviv University and St Antony's College, Oxford from which he received a D.Phil. in history. Ben-Ami speaks fluent Hebrew, Spanish, French, and English.

Academic career
He was a historian at Tel Aviv University from the mid-1970s, serving as head of the School of History from 1982 to 1986.  His initial field of study was Spanish history; his 1983 biography of the former Spanish dictator (1923–30), General Primo de Rivera, is recognized as the most authoritative study on this subject. He later turned his attention to the history of Israel and the Middle East, leaving a legacy of expertise in Spanish interwar politics.

Diplomatic and political career
From 1987 until 1991, before he entered politics, he was the Israeli ambassador to Spain. In 1996 he was elected to the Knesset on Labour's list.

When the One Israel-led government of Ehud Barak took office in July 1999, Ben-Ami became the Minister of Internal Security, responsible for the Israel Police. In August 2000, when David Levy resigned as Foreign Minister during talks with Palestinian leaders in the United States, Barak designated Ben-Ami to be the acting Foreign Minister and he was officially appointed to the role in November 2000.

Ben-Ami remained Foreign Minister and Security Minister until March 2001, when, having won elections, Ariel Sharon took over from Barak. Ben-Ami refused to serve in the Sharon government and resigned from the Knesset in August 2002.

In their report published in 2003, the Or Commission held him responsible for the behavior of security forces during the October 2000 riots in which Israeli police killed 12 Israeli Arabs and one Palestinian, and failed to predict and control rioting which resulted in the death of a Jewish Israeli. The report recommended that Ben-Ami be disqualified from serving as Internal Security Minister in the future. Despite the disqualification, Ben-Ami was not considered to be a hard-liner in Israeli relations with the Palestinians and during his time in the Barak government, he was a political rival of Shimon Peres.

Ben-Ami is currently Vice-President of the Toledo International Centre for Peace (TICpax), which, according to its mission statement, "seeks to contribute to the prevention and resolution of violent or potentially violent international or intranational conflicts and to the consolidation of peace, within a framework of respect and promotion of Human Rights and democratic values."

Ben-Ami is the author of Scars of War, Wounds of Peace: The Israeli–Arab Tragedy (Oxford, 2006), which challenges many of the founding myths in Israel's modern history especially related to the war of independence. His latest book is Prophets without Honor: The 2000 Camp David Summit and the End of the Two-State Solution (Oxford, 2022).
Ben-Ami backed the Meretz party for the 2009 Knesset elections.

Later career
He currently serves as vice president of the Toledo International Centre for Peace of which he is a co-founder.
Through the center, he has been involved in conflict resolution processes such as among others, in Colombia, Dominican Republic ( the tensions with Haiti ), Bolivia ( intercultural issues ), Russia-Georgia, Libya ; Spanish Sahara, and Israel-the Arab world. 
He is now also the co-chair ( together with ex-chief of Mossad Efraim Halevi ) of an Israeli commission for strategic planning.
He has lectured extensively in international conferences in Europe, Russia, the U.S. and Latin America. He is a regular contributor to Project Syndicate since 2006.

Published works
The Origins of the Second Republic in Spain (Oxford University Press, 1978).
Fascism from Above: Dictatorship of Primo de Rivera in Spain, 1923–1930 (Oxford University Press, 1983)
Spain between Dictatorship and Democracy (1980)
Anatomia de una Transición [Anatomy of a Transition] (1990) 
Italy between Liberalism and Fascism (1986)
Historia del Estado de Israel -junto a Zvi Medin- (Ediciones Rialp, 1981).
Quel avenir pour Israël? [Which Future for Israel?], (Presses Universitaires de France, 2001) (Hachette Littérature 2002), . 
A Front Without a Homefront: A Voyage to the Boundaries of the Peace Process (Yedioth Ahatonoth, Tel-Aviv, 2004).
Scars of War, Wounds of Peace: The Israeli–Arab Tragedy (Oxford University Press 2006), .
 Prophets Without Honor (Oxford University Press 2022)

References

External links

Column archives at Project Syndicate

The Rise and Fall of the Oslo Process, University of Utah lecture, 2 March 2004
Debate with Norman Finkelstein, Democracy Now, 14 February 2006
Toledo International Centre for Peace – TICpax

1943 births
Living people
Alumni of St Antony's College, Oxford
Ambassadors of Israel to Spain
Historians of the dictatorship of Primo de Rivera
Israeli Jews
Israeli Labor Party politicians
Members of the 14th Knesset (1996–1999)
Members of the 15th Knesset (1999–2003)
Ministers of Foreign Affairs of Israel
Ministers of Public Security of Israel
20th-century Moroccan Jews
Moroccan emigrants to Israel
One Israel politicians
People from Asilah
People from Kiryat Shmona
Tel Aviv University alumni
Academic staff of Tel Aviv University